Regent House School is a co-educational, controlled grammar school in Newtownards, County Down, Northern Ireland. It comprises two parts: the preparatory department, known as "the Prep", and the main school itself. It has over 1450 pupils from ages 4 to 18.

The school is divided into four houses: Castlereagh, Strangford, Scrabo and Clandeboye.

Inspections

The school was inspected by the Controlled Schools' Support Council in 2015 and judged Satisfactory. In 2019 another inspection was carried out, but could not reach a judgement because of industrial action being taken by staff.

Music
In 2017 the school's choir won BBC Radio Ulster School Choir of the Year.

Sport 

Regent House has won the Ulster Schools Cup and Medallion Shield.

Regent House won the Schools' Cup Final in 1994 where it defeated Wallace High School 8–3 in what has proved to be its only outright victory. Two years later, Regent shared the Schools Cup with Methodist College Belfast following a 9–9 draw.

The cricket team won the McCullough Cup.

Air Training Corps 

Regent has an air cadet squadron, 2241 sqn, a school squadron. The squadron was created out of an army cadet unit in 1951  by Flt Lt  Duff, a teacher and the squadron's first Commanding Officer who had been a pilot during WW2 flying B-25 Mitchell bombers.

There are a number of opportunities on offer from the squadron including Gliding/flying training. The squadron is well located as Newtownards Airfield is nearby; this was the home of 664 VGS flying Grob 109 Vigilant T.1 motorised gliders until 2016.

2241 are winners of the NI Wing SRAFONI (Senior RAF Officer Northern Ireland) Trophy for best overall ATC squadron in Northern Ireland 2011–12.

The 2013 shooting competition for both the team award and the individual award was won by the 2241 team of four.

Notable former pupils

 Jim Allister, Unionist politician and MLA in Northern Ireland
 Nigel Carr, former British Lions rugby player
 David Coulter, Church of Scotland minister and Chaplain General in the British Army
Holly Hamilton, BBC journalist and presenter
 Simon Hamilton, Democratic Unionist Party politician and former minister in the Northern Ireland Executive 
 Eddie Irvine, Formula One racing driver
 Phillip Matthews, former Ireland rugby union international
Maxine Mawhinney, BBC newsreader
 Lieutenant-Colonel Robert Blair "Paddy" Mayne DSO & 3 Bars, founding member of the Special Air Service, former British Lions rugby player
 Michael McGimpsey, Ulster Unionist Party MLA and Minister of Health in the Northern Ireland Executive
 Catherine Jean Milligan, former Miss Northern Ireland
 Colin Murray, Broadcaster 
 Colin Nixon, football player and manager
 Ottilie Patterson, blues singer with the Chris Barber jazz band

External links
Official website
Regent House School's history

References

1924 establishments in Northern Ireland
Educational institutions established in 1924
Grammar schools in County Down
Newtownards